Sytse Ulbe Zuidema (22 April 1906, Kampen - 28 September 1975, Amstelveen) was one of the second generation of reformational philosophers arising from the Free University of Amsterdam, after the first generation of Herman Dooyeweerd and D. H. Th. Vollenhoven.  Other second generationers were:  Hendrik Van Riessen, K. J. Popma and  J. P. A. Mekkes.

Prior to teaching philosophy at the Free University, Zuidema held a chair of Calvinistic philosophy at the University of Utrecht. He had also been a minister in the Reformed Churches and a missionary in Indonesia.  His doctoral dissertation was on William of Ockham.

Robert Knudsen and Hendrik Hart both completed their doctoral dissertations in philosophy under Zuidema.

Timeline 
 1925-1930 Studied at the Free University of Amsterdam
1931-1934 Pastor in Gereformeerde Kerk (Dutch Reformed Church) in Anna Paulowna Polder
 1935-1945 Missionary for the Mission in Central Java, Indonesia (Dutch East Indies)
 1936 Received doctorate from the Free University
 Dissertation: The nominalistic philosophy of William of Ockham
1936-1946 Missionary minister at Soerakarta (Solo).  During World War II he was held at a Japanese prisoner of war camp on Java.
 1946 returned to the Netherlands
 1948 Chair of Christian Philosophy at University of Utrecht and at the Free University
 1954 onwards taught only at the Free University.

Publications 
Kierkegaard in Modern Thinkers, an International Library of Philosophy and theology (Presbyterian & Reformed: Philadelphia) 
Sartre in Modern Thinkers, an International Library of Philosophy and theology (Presbyterian & Reformed: Philadelphia) 
Communication and Confrontation: A Philosophical Appraisal and Critique of Modern Society and Contemporary Thought. Assen/Kampen Royal VanGorcum Ltd, 1972

References

1906 births
1975 deaths
Calvinist and Reformed philosophers
Dutch Calvinist and Reformed Christians
20th-century Dutch philosophers
People from Kampen, Overijssel
Academic staff of Utrecht University
Vrije Universiteit Amsterdam alumni